is a Japanese manga written and illustrated by Yuu Watase. The manga is five volumes long. It has been licensed in North America by Viz Media.

Plot
Yamazaki Tanpopo moves from Hokkaidō to Tokyo in order to begin high school in an entirely new environment. When she goes to see her new school, Meio Academy, she meets a young man who is replanting a Tanpopo (dandelion) flower. At school the next day, Tanpopo is not only amazed by the modern facilities but also that she is in the same class as the young man she met the day before: Kugyou Kouki, the son of the owner of Meio. When she greets him, Kouki pretends not to know her and she is shocked that he would act so differently from their previous meeting.

Meanwhile, the students at the school discover Tanpopo is a commoner from the country side and begin to bully her. In an effort to change the social hierarchy of the school and also find some new friends, Tanpopo cheerfully starts the "Planting Club". Soon, she attracts the attention of students like the insincerely kind Saionji Tsukiko and Kouki, who begins to show his kinder side. However, just as Tanpopo and Kouki's friendship develops and their gardening club grows, secrets of Kugyou family life are revealed. Increasing tensions result as Tanpopo begins to fall in love with Kouki and he reciprocates, though is held back as he is engaged to another girl of the same status.

Characters

 Tanpopo is the main character of the manga, and the majority of the story focuses on her ventures and relationships. Tanpopo, a "country girl", originally lived in Hokkaido with her grandparents, but moved to Tokyo to attend Meio Academy. Although initially rejected by her peers for her lack of money and familial connections, Tanpopo is determined to make her mark on the school. She starts up the "Gardening Club" (despite the fact that live plants are illegal on school grounds) with fellow students in order to bring life back into the school. Tanpopo is both claustrophobic and afraid of the dark, as she was trapped in her parents' car after a crash that killed them both. She also has a pet fox named Poplar.

 Kouki is the main male lead in the manga, and Tanpopo's main love interest. He is a serious young man, and somewhat burdened by his family responsibilities. As he is the richest of all of the students in his school, Kouki feels obligated to live up to the standards that others place on him. He is engaged to a young high class woman, Erika Yanahara, who was previously engaged to Kouki's brother, Youji, before Youji's disappearance. He resents Youji for running away and placing all his responsibilities on him. Kouki is in the "Gardening Club" with Tanpopo and fellow students, and stands up for Tanpopo when others won't, going so far as to deliberately change the school rules for her so that she can have her way. Kouki's favorite hobby is gardening, and when he is around plants, his personality changes from a cold and serious person to a happy, carefree, and somewhat obsessive individual (who even has a Kansai accent). He also carries a gardening scoop with him at all times.

 Aoi is a computer genius with an unusual sense of humor, which contributes to the series' comic relief. He is nicknamed "Flippy" by Tanpopo due to his occasional mentally unstable behavior. He initially hates and antagonizes both Kouki and Tanpopo, but eventually becomes good friends with both of them.

 Tsukiko is Tanpopo's first friend at Meio Academy. Though she appears rather innocent, Tsukiko originally is not very sweet at all, but her friendship with Tanpopo gradually softens her personality and she becomes more caring and loyal. She has her heart set on marrying into the Kugyou family, specifically Kouki, although she eventually gets over this longing after realizing Kouki and Tanpopo's feelings for each other.

Arisa is a Ganguro or Kogal. She wears heavy white makeup and has very tanned skin, earning her the nickname "reverse raccoon". She prefers partying to schoolwork and has a reputation for being a party girl, but after meeting Tanpopo and discovering that she is pregnant by Ogata, she begins to change for the better.

 Erika was originally supposed to marry Youji Kugyou, but after he ran away, she was left as Kouki's responsibility. She loves Kouki as she once loved Youji, but seems to be marrying him only because it is expected of her by her family.

 Youji is Kouki's older brother. He is a free spirit, and runs away from the pressures of his high-status family to become a photographer. Upon his return, he falls in love with Tanpopo, and the two date briefly, but Youji ends their relationship when he realizes that Tanpopo still loves Kouki.
Ogata
 Ogata is one of the most popular, and powerful, students at Meio Academy. He is extremely jealous of Kouki due to his family's wealth and status. Ogata, an infamous ladies' man, is said to have impregnated several female students, including Arisa, at Meio Academy. He even makes a pass at Tanpopo and tries to get her to go out with him. He continually fails to win Tanpopo's heart, however, and is left with the lesser girls of the school. Near the end he decides to take care of Arisa and their baby.

 Poplar is Tanpopo's pet fox. Named after a type of tree, Poplar is a trusty companion to Tanpopo, and is always there for her in times of need.

Volumes
Volume 1: Dandelion, 
Volume 2: Magnolia, 
Volume 3: Daffodil, 
Volume 4: Rose, 
Volume 5: Poppy

Japanese
Listed below are all Japanese Imadoki! tankōbon.
  published in August 2000
  Published in November 2000
  published in February 2001
  published in May 2001
  published in July 2001

References

External links
  Imadoki! at Viz.com

2000 manga
Comedy anime and manga
Romance anime and manga
Shogakukan manga
Shōjo manga
Viz Media manga
Yuu Watase